, formerly known as Honoka Miki, is a Japanese actress, fashion model and voice actress. Yahagi is best known for her role as Kotoko Aihara in Mischievous Kiss: Love in Tokyo and its sequel Mischievous Kiss 2: Love in Okinawa as Kotoko Irie.

Early life
Yahagi was born on 7 March 1997 in Chiba Prefecture, Japan. Yahagi was first scouted while visiting Disneyland with her family in 2008. In April 2009, Yahagi began working as an exclusive model for teen fashion magazine Love Berry. Yahagi's special skills include classical ballet and her favorite musical group is NEWS and TVXQ

In 2016, Yahagi changed her artist name from Honoka Miki to her birth name Honoka Yahagi because she wanted to honor the name she received from her parents.

Filmography

TV drama series

Film

Awards

References

External links

 
 

1997 births
Living people
Japanese expatriates in the United States
Japanese female models
Japanese film actresses
Japanese television actresses
Japanese voice actresses
Voice actresses from Chiba Prefecture
Actors from Chiba Prefecture